70 Million Jobs was an American employment website and employment agency made for people with criminal records. The company was named for the approximately 70 million people in the United States with a criminal record.

History 
Richard Bronson, the founder of 70 Million Jobs created the company due to his inability to find employment following his imprisonment for defrauding stock accounts at his over the counter brokerage house which he founded after leaving Stratton Oakmont. Resulting in Bronson's decision to create 70 Million Jobs. The purpose of the company was aiding former felons find a job. Their method involves helping them write their résumé, and finding companies that can hire felons.

References 

Employment websites in the United States
Employment agencies of the United States